Manina, la fille sans voiles, (released in the US as  Manina, the Girl in the Bikini and in the UK as Manina, the Lighthouse Keeper's Daughter) is a 1952 French film directed by Willy Rozier and starring Brigitte Bardot, Jean-François Calvé and Howard Vernon. The film is one of Bardot's first film roles, at the age of 17 and was controversial for the scanty bikinis worn by the young Bardot in the film, one of the first occasions when a bikini had appeared in film and when the bikini was still widely considered immodest.

Though released in France in 1953 as Manina, la fille sans voiles, the film was not released in the United States until 1958 as Manina, the Girl in the Bikini and in the United Kingdom until 1959 as The Lighthouse-Keeper's Daughter. In other countries it was released under other names. The film was able to be screened in the United States notwithstanding the Hays Code prohibition of exposure of the midriff as a foreign film.

The film was shot in Cannes, Nice and Paris in the summer of 1952. Brigitte Bardot's father had signed a contract, on behalf of his minor daughter, specifying that the film was not to show indecent images. When in the course of filming, a series of "highly suggestive" photographs of his daughter was released, he accused the producing company of not respecting the contract and demanded that the film not be projected without the permission of a court. He lost the suit.

Plot
A 25-year-old Parisian student, Gérard Morere (Calvé), hears a lecture about a treasure Troilus lost at sea after the Peloponnesian War and thinks he knows where it is, thanks to a discovery he made five years earlier when diving near the island of Levezzi, in Corsica. He gets friends and an innkeeper to invest in his dream, enough to get him to Tangiers where he convinces a cigarette smuggler, Eric (Vernon), to take him to the island.

There they find 18-year-old Manina (Bardot), the light-keeper's daughter, who is beautiful and pure. Eric thinks Gérard may have conned him, but Gérard's belief in the treasure compels patience. Gérard dives by day and romances Manina at night. Gérard finds the treasure, though Eric runs away with it and is wrecked in a storm.

Cast
Jean-François Calvé ... Gérard Morère
Brigitte Bardot ... Manina
Howard Vernon ... Éric
Henry Djanik ... Marcel (as H. Djanik)            
Espanita Cortez ... La Franchucha
Raymond Cordy ... Francis, the bartender
Paulette Andrieux ... (as Paulette Andrieu)
Jean Droze ... Buddy of Gérard (as Droze)
Nadine Tallier ... Mathilda (as N. Tallier)
Maurice Bénard ... (as Bénard)

References

External links 
 
 
Review of film at New York Times

1952 films
1950s French-language films
French black-and-white films
1952 adventure films
Treasure hunt films
Films featuring underwater diving
Films set in Corsica
Films set in Tangier
Films set in Paris
Films set in the Mediterranean Sea
Films shot in Corse-du-Sud
Seafaring films
1952 romantic drama films
French romantic drama films
French adventure films
Films directed by Willy Rozier
1950s French films